I formation or I-formation may refer to;

 I formation, an offensive player lineup in American football
 I-formation (tennis), a player positioning strategy in doubles
 I-formation (pickleball), a player positioning strategy in doubles